Domingo Dulce y Garay, 1st Marquis of Castell-Florite (Sotés (La Rioja), Spain, 7 May 1808 - Amélie-les-Bains-Palalda, France, 23 November 1869), was a Spanish noble and general, who fought in the First Carlist War and who served two times as Captain General of Cuba.

He joined the Spanish army in 1823 at the end of the Trienio Liberal and participated in the First Carlist War  under the command of the Christino  Baldomero Espartero, a close friend. During the campaign he won four Lauriate crosses.  His friendship with Espartero let to his collaboration during the Espartero or second regency while Isabel was a minor, during which period he was  prominent in  quelling the moderate liberal  revolt of 1841 when  Diego de León and Manuel de la Concha  tried to enter the Royal Palace of Madrid and kidnap the young queen

In the rank of general he participated in the Second Carlist War and beat the Carlist general Ramón Cabrera y Griñó. he supported General O'Donnell Bienio progresista and then faced a Carlist uprising at Sant Carles de la Ràpita which earned him he title of Marquis of Castell-Florite.

During most  the Liberal Union government period he  was stationed in Cuba as Captain-General although his support of  O'Donnell did not dispel their suspicion of him, even after he served as a senator from 1858 to 1860.

During his stay in America he was noted for his clear commitment to abolish slavery, which earned him the enmity of the Spanish expatriates and open confrontation with Julian de Zulueta. On his return in 1866 he participated in the conspiracy that led to the revolution and the overthrow of Isabella in 1868. 

He returned to Cuba, and is noted for having decreed for the first time on the island – 9 January 1869 – freedom of the press just a few months before his death on 23 November 1869.

1808 births
1869 deaths
Marquesses of Spain
Governors of Cuba
Military personnel of the First Carlist War
Spanish captain generals
Burials at Poblenou Cemetery